The following are the defunct titles in the Genre-Specific Awards Category given by the Mnet Asian Music Awards.

Best Indie Performance

Best House & Electronic

Best Trot

Best Digital Single

See also
 Mnet Asian Music Award for Best Rap Performance
 Mnet Asian Music Award for Best Dance Performance
 Mnet Asian Music Award for Best Band Performance
 Mnet Asian Music Award for Best Vocal Performance
 Mnet Asian Music Award for Best Ballad/R&B Performance - defunct

Notes
 Each year is linked to the article about the Mnet Asian Music Awards held that year.

References

External links
 Mnet Asian Music Awards official website

MAMA Awards